Noumory Keïta (born 26 June 2001) is a Malian volleyball player who has played in Serbia and South Korea. 

He currently plays for Verona Volley in the Italian SuperLega.

References

External links
  at Volleybox

2001 births
Living people
Malian people